Stelio DeRocco (born 13 April 1960) is a former Canadian  volleyball player and coach. He was the coach of the Australia men's national volleyball team at the 2000 Summer Olympics in Sydney, Australia, where the team finished 8th. In 2004, he signed a contract with the Canadian national team until 2006.

De Rocco was a member of the Canadian national team in 1977-80 and 1985–86.

See also
 Australia at the 2000 Summer Olympics
 PlusLiga

References

1960 births
Living people
Canadian men's volleyball players
Place of birth missing (living people)
Australian Institute of Sport coaches
MKS Będzin coaches